Hook End Recording Studios was a recording studio located in Hook End Manor, a 16th-century Elizabethan house near Checkendon, Oxfordshire, England.

History

The original studio, Space Studios, was built by Alvin Lee of the band Ten Years After when he first bought the house. Many recordings were made during Lee's tenure, including On the Road to Freedom (1973), before he sold the house and studio to David Gilmour of the band Pink Floyd, who used the studio to record parts of the band's album The Final Cut (1983). Gilmour sold the house and studio to Clive Langer and Alan Winstanley. They sold it to Trevor Horn, who turned it into Hookend Productions Ltd.

Several major rock bands have recorded albums at the studios. These include Manic Street Preachers' Gold Against the Soul (1993), The Cure's Disintegration (1989) and Mixed Up (1990), and Marillion's Seasons End (1989) and Holidays in Eden (1991).

In October 2017, the house was reported to be abandoned and in a state of disrepair. Hook End Manor is now owned by Mark White.

References

Recording studios in England
Culture in Oxfordshire
David Gilmour